Lybrook is an unincorporated community and census-designated place (CDP) in Rio Arriba County, New Mexico, United States. It was first listed as a CDP prior to the 2020 census.

The CDP is in the southwest corner of the county, bordered to the south by Sandoval County. U.S. Route 550 passes through the center of the community, leading northwest  to Bloomfield and southeast  to Cuba.

Demographics

References 

Census-designated places in Rio Arriba County, New Mexico
Census-designated places in New Mexico